The Gujarat State Human Rights Commission is an autonomous state body with quasi-judicial powers tasked to investigate any violation of human rights in the western state of Gujarat in India. The body was constituted on 12 September 2006.

Significant incidents
The commission has been involved in these incidents:
 Best Bakery case
 Godhra train burning

References

Human rights in India
Human rights
2006 establishments in Gujarat
Government agencies established in 2006